Didn't I may refer to:

 "Didn't I" (James Wesley song), 2011
 "Didn't I" (OneRepublic song), 2020
 "Didn't I (Blow Your Mind This Time)", a 1969 song by the Delfonics
 "Didn't I", a song by Aqua from Aquarium, 1997
 "Didn't I", a song by Jaira Burns from Burn Slow, 2018
 "Didn't I", a song by Kelly Clarkson from Meaning of Life, 2017
 "Didn't I", a song by Rod Stewart from Blood Red Roses, 2018